Francisco Fumaça de Mascarenhas da Costa Pessoa (born 15 May 2000), sometimes known as Masca, is a Portuguese footballer who plays as a forward for Spanish club Real Oviedo Vetusta.

Club career
Born in Cascais, Mascarenhas began his career with G.D. Estoril Praia in 2009, before returning to hometown side GDS Cascais in the following year. He then returned to Estoril in 2014, before spending a one-year spell at C.F. Os Belenenses in the 2016–17 season.

Ahead of the 2018–19 campaign, Mascarenhas was assigned to Estoril's under-23 squad for the newly-created . On 8 July 2020, he moved to Portimonense, being also assigned to the under-23 team.

On 26 August 2022, Mascarenhas moved abroad and joined Real Oviedo's reserves in Segunda Federación. He made his professional debut on 26 February of the following year, coming on as a second-half substitute for Sergi Enrich in a 1–1 Segunda División home draw against Albacete Balompié.

References

External links

2000 births
Living people
People from Cascais
Portuguese footballers
Association football forwards
Segunda División players
Segunda Federación players
Real Oviedo Vetusta players
Real Oviedo players
Portuguese expatriate footballers
Portuguese expatriate sportspeople in Spain
Expatriate footballers in Spain